William Albert Robinson (1877 – 31 December 1949) was a British Labour Party politician who served as the Member of Parliament (MP) for St Helens from his election at the 1935 general election until the 1945 election.

Career
Robinson had previously fought Liverpool Exchange at the 1929 general election. He was elected Member of Parliament (MP) for St Helens at the 1935 general election and served until the 1945 election.

He was an active member of the National Union of Distributive and Allied Workers, for which he had served as Political Secretary.

Personal life
Robinson died on 31 December 1949.

References

External links 
 

1877 births
1949 deaths
Labour Party (UK) MPs for English constituencies
National Union of Distributive and Allied Workers-sponsored MPs
UK MPs 1935–1945
Chairs of the Labour Party (UK)